Partula otaheitana is a species of air-breathing tropical land snail, a terrestrial pulmonate gastropod mollusk in the family Partulidae. This species is endemic to the island of Tahiti, French Polynesia, where it was formerly widely found in the valleys but is now restricted to the highest altitudes.

References

External links

Fauna of French Polynesia
Partula (gastropod)
Taxonomy articles created by Polbot
Gastropods described in 1792